Ranong may refer to
the town Ranong
Ranong Province
Mueang Ranong district